Gursikh (Punjabi: ਗੁਰਸਿੱਖ ) is a term used by Sikhs, either to describe any Sikh, or one who is especially devoted to following the Sikh guru, a "pious, observant Sikh".

See also
 Amritdhari
 Anand Karaj
 Gurmukh
 List of Sikhism-related topics

References

Sikh terminology